Choi Duck-joo (Hangul: 최덕주, born 3 January 1960) is a South Korean football former player, coach and current manager of Daegu FC. He managed South Korea women's U-17 team when they won the 2010 U-17 Women's World Cup.

References

External links

KFA Profile

1960 births
Living people
South Korean footballers
Pohang Steelers players
K League 1 players
South Korean football managers
Chung-Ang University alumni
Sportspeople from South Gyeongsang Province
South Korea women's under-20 national football team managers
South Korea women's under-17 national football team managers
Association football forwards